The Eastern Academic Research Consortium, or "Eastern Arc", is a regional research collaboration between the University of East Anglia, the University of Essex, and the University of Kent. The three partner institutions are all part of the "plate glass universities" established in the 1960s.

The establishment of Eastern Arc was recognised by Harrison, Smith and Kinton (2015) as part of the 'new regionalisation of UK higher education.'

First Iteration: 2013-19 
In its first iteration Eastern Arc focussed on three themes to encourage interdicsdiplinary collaboration between its members. Each university acted as the academic lead in one of the three areas.

The three themes 

 Digital Humanities was led by the University of Kent. 
 Quantitative Social Science was led by the University of Essex. 
 Synthetic Biology was led by the University of East Anglia.

Leads and fellows 
Each of the themes was led by a permanent academic at each university, and a fellow was appointed on a five-year contract to work with them, meaning that there were nine early career researchers funded across Eastern Arc

Studentships 
Within Digital Humanities and Quantitative Social Sciences there were two students at each university; in Synthetic Biology there were three.

Networks and funding 
During its first iteration, Eastern Arc was involved in a number of funded projects and networks, including Enabling Innovation: Research to Application (EIRA) (funded by Research England), the Business and Local Government Data Research Centre (funded by the Economic and Social Research Council), and the Thames Estuary Production Corridor (funded by the Department for Digital, Culture, Media and Sport (DCMS)). It was also part of three doctoral training partnerships:

 Advanced Research and Innovation in the Environmental Sciences (ARIES), funded by the Natural Environment Research Council. Other members are: Plymouth, Royal Holloway.
 Consortium of the Humanities and the Arts South-east England (CHASE), funded by the Arts and Humanities Research Council. Other members are: Birkbeck, Goldsmiths, Courtauld, Open University, SOAS, Sussex.
 South East Network for Social Sciences (SeNSS), funded by the Economic and Social Research Council. Other members are: City, Goldsmiths, Reading, Roehampton, Royal Holloway, Surrey, Sussex.

Second Iternation: 2020-25
In 2019 Phil Ward was appointed as the consortium's first director. He developed a strategy for 2020-25 that continued to focus on developing interdisciplinary collaborations, but moved away from the three pillars of the first iteration, focusing instead on four themes that were identified as collective strengths of the three universities through mapping field-weighted citation impact, REF2014 outcomes, grant capture and a number of other qualitative data.

The four themes 

 Culture, connection and creativity
 Health systems, social care and wellbeing
 Human rights, equality and conflict
 Sustainability, natural resources and food

Eastern Arc 'champions' were appointed to take academic leadership within each of the four themes.

The three objectives 
In its second iteration, Eastern Arc has three objectives:

 to develop a strong collaborative core within its themes
 to support experimental, risk-taking activity. This was intended to rediscover and build on the radical foundational principles that the three EARC universities shared with many of the plate glass universities. 
 to engage with external policy-makers and end-users.

Political engagement 
As part of its third objective, EARC has started to engage pro-actively with political debate around contemporary issues relating to regional and science policy. It has published a series of position papers and an open letter to the Chancellor of the Exchequer in response to the UK government's cuts to ODA research funding. It questioned the focus of the UK's 'levelling-up agenda' and the need for a granular analysis of need to be undertaken. It noted that the east and southeast of England, which was relatively prosperous, was also home to significant deprivation, particularly in its coastal communities (such as Jaywick, which has been identified as the most deprived ward in the country).

References 

College and university associations and consortia in the United Kingdom
East of England
Organizations established in 2013
Research organisations in the United Kingdom
University of East Anglia
University of Essex
University of Kent
2013 establishments in England